The High Court of Sindh (Sindhi: سنڌ ھائي ڪورٽ)is the highest judicial institution of the Pakistani province of Sindh. Established in 1906, the Court situated in the provincial capital at Karachi. Apart from being the highest Court of Appeal for Sindh in civil and criminal matters, the Court was the District Court and the Court of Session in Karachi.

History 

On 21 August 1926, the Sindh Courts Act (Bom. VII of 1926) was passed into law-making provision for the establishment of a Chief Court for the Province of Sindh. On the coming into operation of Part III of the Government of India Act, 1935, on 1 April 1937, Sindh became a separate Province and the Judges of the Court of Judicial Commissioner of Sindh were appointed by Royal Warrant by the British Government.

At the time of establishment of the High Court of West Pakistan the number of the Judges of the Karachi Bench was almost the same but subsequently it was increased to 15 and on separation of Sindh & Balochistan High Court's 12 Judges were allocated to the Sindh High Court and 3 Judges to Balochistan High Court. The present approved strength of Judges is 28. However, the number of Judges appointed is 24.

Building Complex 

The construction of existing main building was commenced in 1923, at an estimated cost of Rs. 39,75,248 but it was completed on 22-11-1929, at actual cost of Rs. 30,35,000. This building which was meant for 5 Judges with some provision for expansion in 1929 is now accommodating Benches in, Court Rooms and 18 Judges in Chambers. Some Judges have to hold Courts in Chambers. Besides, it also provides accommodation for the offices of the Attorney-General, Deputy Attorney-General, Federal Shariat Court of Pakistan Registry, Advocate-General, Sindh, Additional Advocate General, Sindh, Assistant Advocate General, Sindh and High Court Bar Library. Before shifting Supreme Court Registry from High Court premises two Court rooms and three Chambers were used by the Supreme Court Judges. When the Supreme Court comes to Karachi in bigger strength some more chambers were provided to the Judges of the Supreme Court.

In 1974, An Annexe Building on the North-East side of the compound of the High Court was constructed at a cost of Rs. 4.4 million but it did not ease the situation much, for it is accommodating the offices of this Court and also provides office accommodation for the Secretary, Ministry of Justice and Parliamentary Affairs, Standing Counsel, Official Assignee, Special Banking Court, Registry of the Federal Shariat Court and Sindh Bar Council. Thus, it will be seen that there is acute shortage of accommodation.

The provincial Government has allocated a token amount of Rs. One Lac during the current year for construction of Annexe Building of South-East of the present building in order to make the scheme as ongoing scheme. The building was estimated in 1984 to cost a sum of Rs. 13.35 million. The cost now may go up slightly because of inflation. Unless the Federal Government provides funds or the Provincial Government give preference to the construction of this building and provide necessary funds, the building is not going to be completed within a year or two.

Bench 

High Court of Sindh consists of a Chief Justice and 27 other Judges. A Judge of the High Court is appointed by the President after consultation with the Chief Justice of Pakistan, the Governor of the Province and the Chief Justice of the High Court in which appointment is to be made. No person is appointed as a Judge of the High Court unless he is a citizen of Pakistan having forty years and has been an advocate of the High Court or has held a judicial office for ten years and has for a period of not less than three years served as or exercised the functions of a District Judge in Pakistan. A Judge of a High Court holds office until he attains the age of sixty-two years, unless he sooner resigns or is removed from office in accordance with the Constitution.

The principal seat of the High Court of Sindh is at Karachi with a Bench at Hyderabad, Sukkur and Larkana The High Court may have more Benches at other places as the Governor on the advice of the Cabinet and in consultation with the Chief Justice of the High Court may determine Jurisdiction.

PC0 25 March 1981 
Agha Ali Hyder-not offered oath under PCO as chief justice of Sindh High Court; took oath under PCO as judge of Federal Shariat Court
Abdul Hayee Qureshi took oath under PCO
Abdul Hafeez Memon did not take oath under PCO
Zaffar Hussain Mirza took oath under PCO
Naimuddin Ahmed took oath under PCO
S.A. Nusrat took oath under PCO
G. M. Shah did not take oath under PCO
Ajmal Mian took fresh oath as new judge under PCO
Muhammad Zahoor-ul-Haq took fresh oath as new judge under PCO
Sajjad Ali Shah took fresh oath as new judge under PCO
Ghous Ali Shah took oath under PCO
Dr. Tanzil-ur-Rehman took fresh oath as new judge under PCO
Saeed-uz-Zaman Siddiqui took fresh oath as new judge under PCO
Ghulam Muhammad Kourejo took oath under PCO
Nasir Aslam Zahid took fresh oath as new judge under PCO
K. A. Ghani took oath under PCO
 Saleem Akhtar took fresh oath as new judge under PCO

PC0 26 January 2000 
Nazim Hussain Siddiqi	take oath under PCO was chief justice
 Iftikhar Muhammad Chaudhary  take oath under PCO 
Ghous Mohammed	Not invited to take oath/ cease to hold office 
Mushtaq Memon  Not invited to take oath/ cease to hold office 
Rasheed Rizvi Not invited to take oath/ cease to hold office 
Syed Deedar Hussain    take oath under PCO
Amanullah Abbasi take oath under PCO
Hamid Ali Mirza	take oath under PCO
Hameed Dogar	take oath under PCO
Syed Saeed Ashad		take oath under PCO
Abdul Ghani Shaikh		take oath under PCO
Mohammed Roshan Esani	take oath under PCO
S. A. Sarwar	take oath under PCO
Zahid Qurban Alvi,	take oath under PCO
Shabir Ahmed	take oath under PCO
Ata-ur-Rehman	take oath under PCO
Ghulam Rabban	take oath under PCO
Sarmad Jalal Usmani		take oath under PCO
Anwar Zaheer Jamali take oath under PCO
S. A. Rabbani	take oath under PCO
M. Ashraf Leghari	take oath under PCO
Wahid Bux Brohi	take oath under PCO
Sabihuddin Ahmed	take oath under PCO
Rana Bhagwandas	take oath under PCO
Ghulam Nabi Soomro 	take oath under PCO
Mushir Alam	take oath under PCO

PC0 3 November 2007 
Sabihuddin Ahmed – Did not take oath under PCO was chief justice
Sarmad Jalal Usmani -Did not take oath under PCO
Anwar Zaheer Jamali -Did not take oath under PCO
Musheer Alam -Did not take oath under PCO
Mohammad Moosa K. Legari -take oath under Pco elevated to supreme court
Zia Perwez – take oath under Pco elevated to supreme court
Afzal Soomro -take oath under PCO became chief justice
Rahmad Hussain Jaferi -Did not take oath under PCO
Azizullah Memon -take oath under PCO
Khilji Arif Hussain -Did not take oath under PCO
Ameer Hani Muslim -Did not take oath under PCO
Gulzar Ahmad -Did not take oath under PCO
Maqbool Baqar -Did not take oath under PCO
Munib Ahmad Khan -take oath under PCO
Muhammad Athar Saeed -Did not take oath under PCO
Yasmin Abbasey -take oath under PCO
Mrs Qaiser Iqbal -take oath under PCO
Ali Sain Dino Metlo-take oath under PCO
Faisal Arab – Did not take oath under PCO
Sajjad Ali Shah -Did not take oath under PCO
Nadeem Azhar Siddiqui – take oath under PCO was additional judge
Abdul Rasheed Kalwar – Did not take oath under PCO was additional judge
Salman Ansari – Did not take oath under PCO was additional judge
Arshad Siraj Memon – Did not take oath under PCO was additional judge
Zafar Ahmad Khan Sherwani – Did not take oath under PCO was additional judge
Mahmood Alam Rizvi – take oath under PCO was additional judge
Abdul Rahman Farooq Pirzada – take oath under PCO was additional judge
Additional Judges Appointed under PCO
Khawaja Naveed Ahmed
Qazi  Khalid
Rana Shamim
Agha Rafiq Ahmed Khan
Syed Pir Ali Shah
Bin Yamin
Arshad Noor
Dr Qamaruddin Bohra
Ghulam Dastagir Shahani
Farrukh Zia Sheikh
Abdul Qadir Khan

Reappointment of Judges
After the general election and resignation of general musharaf ppp lead govt decided to reappoint judges under the 1973 constitution and given fresh oath some of the judges agreed to take fresh oath under constitution and reappointed on 
27 August 2008 and 6 September 2008
Reappointed in August 2008
Anwar Zaheer Jamali – made chief justice
Khilji Arif Hussain
Ameer Hani Muslim
Faisal Arab
Sajjad Ali Shah
Abdul Rasheed Kalwar
Salman Ansari
Zafar Ahmad Khan Sherwani
Reappointed on 6 September 2008
Sabihuddin Ahmed elevated to supreme court 
Sarmad Jalal Usmani elevated to supreme court
Gulzar Ahmad
Muhammad Athar Saeed
Reappointed in December 2008
Agha Rafiq Ahmed Khan with original seniority- posted as Federal Secretary Law and Justice

Restoration of Judges
After the long march of lawyer and opposition parties, on 16 March 2009, the Government restored the deposed judiciary. Only two judges refused to be reappointed: Musheer Alam and Maqbool Baqar.

Former Chief Justices 

 Mr. Justice Abdul Kadir Shaikh (01-12-1976 to 30-06-1979)
 Mr. Justice Ahga Ali Hyder (01-07-1979 to 24-03-1981)
 Mr. Justice Abdul Hayee Qureshi (25-03-1981 to 19-01-1986)
 Mr. Justice Naimuddin Ahmed (21-01-1986 to 03-09-1988)
 Mr. Justice Ajmal Mian (04-09-1988 to 12-12-1989)
 Mr. Justice Sajjad Ali Shah (13-12-1989 to 04-11-1990)
 Mr. Justice Saeed-uz-Zaman Siddiqui (05-11-1990 to 21-05-1992)
 Mr. Justice Nasir Aslam Zahid (23-05-1992 to 15-04-1994)
 Mr. Justice Abdul Hafeez Memon (Acting Chief Justice)(16-04-1994 to 14-04-1996)
 Mr. Justice Mamoon Kazi (15-04-1996 to 04-11-1997)
 Mr. Justice Wajihuddin Ahmed (05-11-1997 to 04-05-1998)
 Mr. Justice Kamal Mansur Alam (05-05-1998 to 21-04-1999)
 Mr. Justice Nazim Hussain Siddiqui (22-04-1999 to 03-02-2000)
 Mr. Justice Syed Deedar Hussain Shah (04-02-2000 to 27-04-2000)
 Mr. Justice Saiyed Saeed Ashhad (28-04-2000 to 04-04-2005)
 Mr. Justice Sabihuddin Ahmed (05-04-2005 to 03-11-2007)
 Mr. Justice Afzal Soomro (03-11-2007 to 15-05-2008)
 Mr. Justice Azizullah M. Memon (Acting Chief Justice)(15-05-2008 to 27-08-2008)
 Mr. Justice Anwar Zaheer Jamali (28-08-2008 to 02-08-2009)
 Mr. Justice Sarmad Jalal Osmany (03-08-2009 to 13-02-2011)
 Mr. Justice Mushir Alam (14-02-2011 to 19-09-2013)
 Mr. Justice Maqbool Baqar (20-09-2013 to 16-02-2015)
 Mr. Justice Faisal Arab (17-02-2015 to 13-12-2015)
 Mr. Justice Syed Sajjad Ali Shah (14-12-2015) to (15-03-2017)

Judges of Sindh High Court 
High Court of Sindh is headed by a Chief Justice. The bench consist of Justices and additional judges and the retirement age of Chief Justice and Justices is 62 years. The Additional Judges are initially appointed for one year, after that their services could either be extended or they could be confirmed or they are retired. The current Chief Justice of Sindh High Court is Justice Ahmed Ali M. Shaikh

Current Composition

See also
Supreme Court of Pakistan
 Sindh Judicial Academy
Lahore High Court
Peshawar High Court
Balochistan High Court
Islamabad High Court

References

External links
Sindh High Court

 
Sindh law
High Courts of Pakistan
1926 establishments in Asia